David Ian Liddell-Grainger  (26 January 1930 – 12 March 2007) was a Scottish politician.

Personal life
David Liddell-Grainger was the son of Captain Henry Hubert Liddell-Grainger (1886–1935), Scots Guards, JP, DL, of a landed gentry family of Ayton Castle, Scottish Borders (formerly of Middleton Hall, Middleton, Northumberland), and Lady Muriel Felicia Vere Bertie, daughter of Montague Bertie, 12th Earl of Lindsey. His stepfather was Sir Malcolm Barclay-Harvey. He was educated at St Peter's College, Adelaide, and Eton. He later attended the University of London.

On 14 December 1957, he married Anne Mary Sibylla Abel Smith, the daughter of Henry Abel Smith and Lady May Abel Smith. The marriage took place in St. George's Chapel, Windsor, at which Her Majesty The Queen and other members of the Royal Family were present. The couple had five children:
Ian Richard Peregrine Liddell-Grainger (born 23 February 1959)
Charles Montagu Liddell-Grainger (born 23 July 1960)
Simon Rupert Liddell-Grainger (born 28 December 1962)
Alice Mary Liddell-Grainger (born 3 March 1965)
Malcolm Henry Liddell-Grainger (born 14 December 1967)

Liddell-Grainger and Christine de la Rue (née Schellin) conducted an affair in the 1970s that was open knowledge. As a result, Liddell-Grainger and his then wife, Anne, were divorced in 1981. Christine de la Rue was also married but moved into the Liddell-Grainger family home, Ayton Castle, near Eyemouth. The couple had two children, (David) Henry Liddell-Grainger (born 31 January 1983) and Maximilian Liddell-Grainger (born 1985; died 1998) and subsequently married on 18 October 1996. Despite this, when Christine Liddell-Grainger's first husband, Sir Eric de la Rue, became terminally ill, he was moved into  Ayton Castle, where he stayed until his death.

When Liddell-Grainger died in 2007, Ayton Castle and its  estate were left to the surviving son of his second marriage, not to the children of his first marriage.

In July 2015 the castle was sold although elements of the estate have been retained by the Liddell-Grainger family.

Affiliations
In 1955, he was created an Officer of St John of Jerusalem and later a Knight of that order in 1974 and served in the Royal Company of Archers between 1955 and 1983. He was a member of Berwickshire County Council from 1958 and 1973. and Deputy Lieutenant of Berwickshire between 1963 and 1985.

Freemasonry
He was Initiated into Scottish Freemasonry in The Lodge of Ayton Castle, No.1423, and served as Master of that Lodge 1960-1961. He was a Founder Member of Lodge Sir Robert Moray, No.1641, (Edinburgh, Scotland) and also a Founder Member of Lodge Fleur de Lys, No.1722, (Airdrie, North Lanarkshire). He was elected a member of the Grand Committee of the Grand Lodge of Antient Free and Accepted Masons of Scotland in 1962.

Liddell-Grainger was Grand Master Mason of the Grand Lodge of Scotland from 1969 until 1974.

References

1930 births
2007 deaths
Place of birth missing
Place of death missing
People educated at St Peter's College, Adelaide
People educated at Eton College
Alumni of the University of London
Deputy Lieutenants of Berwickshire
Knights of the Order of St John
Members of the Royal Company of Archers
Fellows of the Society of Antiquaries of Scotland
Scottish Freemasons
20th-century antiquarians